Standings and results for Group G of the UEFA Euro 2008 qualifying tournament.

Romania secured qualification to the tournament proper on 17 October 2007 following a 2–0 win against Luxembourg, and a 1–1 draw between Albania and Bulgaria, becoming the fourth team in the whole of the qualification stage to do so. The Netherlands secured qualification to the tournament proper on 17 November 2007 following a 1–0 win against Luxembourg, becoming the ninth team in the whole of the qualification stage to do so.

Standings

Matches 
Group G fixtures were negotiated at a meeting between the participants in Amsterdam, Netherlands on 16 February 2006.

Goalscorers

References 
UEFA website

Group G
2006–07 in Albanian football
2007–08 in Albanian football
2006–07 in Bulgarian football
2007–08 in Bulgarian football
2006–07 in Dutch football
Qual
2006–07 in Romanian football
2007–08 in Romanian football
Romania at UEFA Euro 2008
2006–07 in Slovenian football
2007–08 in Slovenian football
2006–07 in Luxembourgian football
2007–08 in Luxembourgian football
2006 in Belarusian football
2007 in Belarusian football